The 1974 NCAA College Division football rankings are from the United Press International poll of College Division head coaches and from the Associated Press poll of sportswriters and broadcasters. The 1974 NCAA Division II football season was the 17th year UPI published a Coaches Poll and it was the 15th year for the Associated Press. Both polls used the term "College Division" in 1974, but many of the referenced publications continued to use the "Small College" terminology.

The final UPI poll was released before the Division II playoffs, and the final AP poll was released after the playoffs. The following season would be the last year AP & UPI would publish College Division / Small College rankings.

Legend

The AP poll

The UPI Coaches poll

Notes

References

Rankings
NCAA College Division football rankings